Pierre Bettencourt (28 July 1917 – 13 April 2006) was a French writer and printer.

1917 births
2006 deaths
20th-century French non-fiction writers
20th-century French male writers
French printers
Outsider art
French publishers (people)
Pierre